The Double Jeopardy (Scotland) Act 2011 is an Act of the Scottish Parliament which received Royal Assent on 27 April 2011. and came into force on 28 November 2011. The Act creates a statutory basis for the rule against trying a person twice for the same crime (known as double jeopardy). The Act also creates three narrow exceptions to this rule.

Following the acquittal of Angus Sinclair for the World's End Murders in 2007, on 20 November 2007 the then Cabinet Secretary for Justice Kenny MacAskill MSP instructed the Scottish Law Commission to consider the law relating to several issues arising from the trial and make recommendations for reform. One of these issues was "the principle  of double jeopardy, and whether there should be exceptions to it"

In December 2009 the Scottish Law Commission published its report on the principle of double jeopardy. The commission recommended that the principle be retained in Scottish Law and also "The general rule against double jeopardy should be reformed and restated in statute". The commission further recommended that exceptions to the rule be created in three circumstances:
 Where the acquittal is tainted by offences against the course of justice such as (but not limited to) bribery, perverting the course of justice and subornation of perjury. The commission concluded that perjury in itself should not be suitable grounds to order a retrial. 
 Where the previously acquitted has made a credible admission of guilt.  
 Where new evidence which was not and could not with ordinary diligence have been available at the trial has been found. The commission recommended that this only be permitted where the new evidence "substantially strengthens the case against the accused" and that if a reasonable jury had heard the evidence at the trial that this would have made it highly likely that the accused be convicted.

The commission addressed the issue of retrospectivity, recommending that any exceptions to the rule of double jeopardy only apply to cases heard after any legislation created to create the exceptions is passed. This recommendation was not followed by the Scottish Government and the Double Jeopardy (Scotland) Bill introduced on 7 October 2010 included provisions to apply the proposed legislation retrospectively. Almost all of the other recommendations made by the Commission made it into the bill.

References 

Acts of the Scottish Parliament 2011